Kalijar may refer to:
 Kalijar, Gilan
 Kalijar, Mazandaran